US Post Office-Metropolitan Station, originally known as Station "A," is a historic post office building located at Williamsburg in Brooklyn, New York, United States. It was built in 1936, and is one of a number of post offices in New York designed by the Office of the Supervising Architect under Louis A. Simon.  The building is a two-story, flat roofed brick building with a three bay wide central pavilion flanked by three bay wide wings in the Colonial Revival style. A contributing architect is believed to be Lorimer Rich.

It was listed on the National Register of Historic Places in 1988.

References

Williamsburg
Government buildings completed in 1936
Colonial Revival architecture in New York City
Government buildings in Brooklyn
Williamsburg, Brooklyn
National Register of Historic Places in Brooklyn
1936 establishments in New York City